Bouin-Plumoison is a commune in the Pas-de-Calais department in the Hauts-de-France region in northern France.

Geography
A small village situated some 2 miles (3 km) west of Hesdin on the D149 road.

Population

See also
Communes of the Pas-de-Calais department

References

Communes of Pas-de-Calais
Artois